Milson James Redstone (3 December 1915 – 3 May 1995) was an Australian rules footballer who played with South Melbourne in the Victorian Football League (VFL).

Redstone later served in the Australian Army during World War II.

Notes

External links 

1915 births
1995 deaths
VFL/AFL players born in England
Australian rules footballers from Victoria (Australia)
Sydney Swans players
People from Kingston upon Thames